Ken Mauer Jr. (born April 23, 1955 in St. Paul, Minnesota) is a former official in the National Basketball Association (NBA) from the 1986–87 NBA season to the 2021-22 NBA season.  He was forced to resign for refusal to take the Covid vaccine.  As of the beginning of the 2017–18 NBA season, Mauer officiated in 1,717 regular season and 229 playoff games. Mauer wore  uniform number 41.

Personal life
Mauer attended Harding Senior High School in St. Paul and later attended and graduated from the University of Minnesota in 1977.  At Minnesota,  Mauer played baseball and was named an All-Big Ten player.  Mauer comes from a family heavily involved in athletics.  Ken's cousins include Joe Mauer and Jake Mauer. Ken's father and four brothers were all referees, including his brother Tom Mauer, a referee in the Women's National Basketball Association. Outside of officiating, Mauer is a guest speaker at basketball officiating camps and clinics and charitable and social groups.

Mauer's hobbies include cars, art, theater, movies, and traveling.

NBA officiating career

Early career
Mauer officiated for 12 years in the state of Minnesota, nine years at the collegiate level, and later six years in the Continental Basketball Association before being hired by the NBA prior to the 1986–87 season.  In 1993, Mauer was selected to officiate the NBA Europe Tour in London, England.

NBA Finals debut
Mauer was one of 12 referees selected to work the 2006 NBA Finals between the Dallas Mavericks and Miami Heat, the first Finals of his career. Mauer's first game in the championship series was Game 3.

References

1955 births
Living people
Continental Basketball Association referees
Minnesota Golden Gophers baseball players
National Basketball Association referees
Sportspeople from Saint Paul, Minnesota
Baseball players from Saint Paul, Minnesota